Charmer or Charmers or The Charmer or the Charmers may refer to:

Film and TV
 The Charmer (1917 film), American silent film
 The Charmer (1925 film), lost silent Pola Negri film
 The Charmer (1931 film), Italian comedy film directed by Guido Brignone
 The Charmer (2017 film), Danish film
 "The Charmers" (The Avengers), 1964 TV episode
 The Charmer (TV series), 1987 British television serial

Music

Performers
 Lloyd Charmers (1938–2012), ska and reggae singer and musician
 Louis Farrakhan (born 1933), performed as a calypso singer "The Charmer"
 The Charmers (band)
 Charmer, emo band from Michigan

Albums 
 Charmer (Tigers Jaw album), 2014
 Charmer (Aimee Mann album), 2012
 The Charmer (album), a 2006 album by Family Groove Company
 Charmer, a 2015 album by Claptone

Songs 
 "Charmer" (Strawbs song), 1976
 "Charmer" (Kings of Leon song), 2007
 "Charmer" (N-Dubz song), 2022

Other uses
 Charmer (folklore), English practitioners of a specific kind of folk magic

See also 
 Charm (disambiguation)
 Snake charmer (disambiguation)